The 2002–03 Tulsa Golden Hurricane men's basketball team represented the University of Tulsa as a member of the Western Athletic Conference in the 2002–03 college basketball season. The Golden Hurricane played their home games at the Reynolds Center. Led by head coach John Phillips, they finished the season 23–10 overall and 12–6 in conference play to finish second in the WAC standings. The team won the 2003 WAC men's basketball tournament to earn an automatic bid to the NCAA tournament as No. 13 seed in the Midwest region. The Golden Hurricane upset No. 4 seed Dayton in the first round, before falling to Wisconsin in the Round of 32.

Roster

Schedule and results

|-
!colspan=9 style=| Regular Season

|-
!colspan=9 style=| WAC Tournament

|-
!colspan=9 style=| NCAA Tournament

Rankings

References

Tulsa Golden Hurricane men's basketball seasons
Tulsa
Tulsa Golden Hurricane men's b
Tulsa Golden Hurricane men's b
Tulsa